, also known as  and colloquially as the "Japanese Spider-Man", is a fictional character and superhero portrayed by Kōsuke Kayama (Shinji Tōdō) based on the Marvel Comics character of the same name. He is the protagonist of Toei's 1978 Spider-Man television series, subsequently reappearing as a supporting character in the 2014–2015 Spider-Verse and 2018 Spider-Geddon comic storylines, and in the animated film Spider-Man: Across the Spider-Verse (2023).

The success of Yamashiro and his giant mecha robot Leopardon made Toei adapt the concept to their Super Sentai franchise in Battle Fever J, ultimately making the character the narrative-forefather of the Power Rangers.

Character development and execution 

The Takuya Yamashiro incarnation of Spider-Man is drastically different from the traditional Marvel Comics version, with the former sharing the same name, costume, and primary superpowers.

The series greatly influenced later Tokusatsu series and anime series, as Yamashiro's series introduced the concept of a superhero summoning a giant robot to fight an enlarged enemy for them. While series about heroes with a giant robot have been around prior to Yamashiro, it had yet to be combined with a superhero who also fights enemies himself. As a result, it became a permanent staple of the Super Sentai franchise beginning with Battle Fever J.

Fictional character biography 
Takuya Yamashiro was a motocross driver, son of the astrophysicist Dr. Hiroshi Yamashiro, and the man who would become his reality's Spider-Man. Whilst practicing on his motorbike, Takuya began to receive telepathic messages from an alien called Garia, who had been imprisoned in a cave by a vampiric warlord called Professor Monster. His sister, Shinko and girlfriend, Hitomi Sakuma asked for his assistance in investigating the crashed Leopardon but Takuya refused as he had a race to compete in. His father, who had been searching for Garia, accepted this and set out with Shinko and Hitomi. Later, before leaving for the contest, Takuya received more messages from Garia and went to investigate. In the mountains he found Hitomi and Shinko who told Takuya their father had been attacked. Takuya found his dying father, who had received fatal injuries from a creature working for Professor Monster called Boukunryu. After his father died, Takuya was attacked by the Iron Cross Army and gravely injured and he fell into the cave where Garia was imprisoned. Garia saved his life by giving him the Spider Bracelet and Spider Extract, which granted him spider-like abilities, and he then informed Takuya of the invasion of Professor Monster, as well as his personal history. Back at his house, Garia told Takuya of his new costume and abilities and tested them out, before discovering the Iron Cross Army had kidnapped Professor Fujita. Spider-Man set out to confront the group and freed the Professor. He was then attacked by Boukunryu and found himself unable to defeat the monster, until he summoned Leopardon and unleashed its Sword Vigor and destroyed Boukunryu, vowing to defeat the rest of the Iron Cross Army.

After defeating Boukunryu, Yamashiro continued to operate as a superhero after heading a message from his father's diary which read 'always take responsibility for your actions'. After joining Interpol, he eventually confronted and seemingly killed Professor Monster, finally avenging his father's death. He also gave a young orphaned boy named Ichiro Murakami superpowers after a blood transfusion.

Comic appearances

Spider-Verse and Spider-Geddon 

During the "Spider-Verse" storyline, Takuya was brought from Earth-51778 into the war against the Inheritors by Earth-616's Spider-Man and Spider-Girl, as well as Earth-65's Spider-Woman. As soon as the group arrived in their former safe zone, Earth-13, Takuya, who was already piloting the Leopardon, faced off against Solus, but the villain made quick work of the giant robot. Luckily, Takuya managed to escape the confrontation alive and join the rest of the spiders. Takuya stayed with the group of Spiders and during the final battle in Loomworld, he was reunited with Leopardon. Spider-Man 2099 and Lady Spider managed to fix the robot with "some future tech and some steam-power". After the Inheritors' defeat, Takuya safely returned to his world.

Takuya remained on Planet Spider, where he had lived in a traditional Japanese house, and allowed Spider-Zero to stay with him until Miles came. Soon after, Spider-Zero and Miles began their journey to repair the multiverse.

The Machine Bem Monsters that were created to stop Takuya attacked the new team of Spider-Men, and Takuya came through a portal from Planet Spider along with Leopardon. He participated in the final battle, and was later sent back to his home universe by Spiderling.

During the "Spider-Geddon" storyline, Superior Spider-Man (Doctor Octopus' mind in a Proto-Clone body) and Spider-Man of Earth-1048 warn Takuya that the Inheritors have escaped. He talks with the alternate Spider-Men on how to defeat the Inheritors. He allows Superior Spider-Man to analyze the Multiverse to find new recruits to help fight the Inheritors like a Spider-Cop and a Tyrannosaurus. During the Spider-Army's attack on the Inheritors who are using the abandoned New U Technologies as a base, Takuya starts to have Leopardon transform until he is attacked by Daemos. When Miles Morales became the latest Captain Universe, he used Leopardon's sword to attack Solus, Brix, Bora, and Daemos.

Powers and abilities
His powers include superhuman strength, speed, accelerated healing, being able to cling to most surfaces, heightened eyesight, and X-ray vision. He ages slower than regular humans, and is a skilled practitioner of ninjitsu. He also has the ability to communicate with spiders, and like many other versions of Spider-Man, he possesses a spider-sense which warns him of danger, in addition to having precognitive dreams. Similarly, he also uses his Spider Bracelet to shoot webs and nets, with the device also being able to magnetically unlock doors, identify aliens in disguise, and deflect lasers. The Spider Bracelet vanishes when it is not in use, in addition to being able to produce a spare version of his costume if his original is damaged. His powers can be transferred to other people via a blood transfusion.

In other media

Film
 Takuya Yamashiro and Leopardon will appear in the upcoming film Spider-Man: Across the Spider-Verse.

Merchandise
 Takuya Yamashiro was released as an S.H.Figuarts action figure in 2020.
 A Takuya Yamashiro Funko Pop Vinyl figure was released as a Previews exclusive in 2021, with a second Funko Pop Vinyl figure bundled with a soda drink becoming available in 2022. 
 Takuya Yamashiro was released as a Marvel Legends action figure in 2022, as part of Marvel Legends Beyond Amazing wave.
 A Nendoroid figure of Takuya Yamashiro was released in February 2022.

Miscellaneous
 Apart from the costume and powers of the main character, this TV series is unrelated to Ryoichi Ikegami's earlier manga adaptation of Spider-Man or the original Spider-Man comics. However, several manga adaptations of the Toei version were published by different magazines, such as TV Land, Tanoshī Yōchien, TV Magazine, and Bōken'ō.
 A version of Spider-Man's giant robot, Leopardon, appears in the Ernest Cline novel Ready Player One.

See also 
 Spider-Man in television
 Spider-Man in film

References

External links 
 

Alternative versions of Spider-Man
Fictional characters from parallel universes
Fictional characters from Tokyo
Fictional characters with precognition
Fictional characters with superhuman durability or invulnerability
Fictional characters with superhuman senses
Fictional Ninjutsu practitioners
Fictional photographers
Fictional racing drivers
Fictional vigilantes
Male characters in television
Marvel Comics characters who can move at superhuman speeds
Marvel Comics characters with accelerated healing
Marvel Comics characters with superhuman strength
Marvel Comics martial artists
Marvel Comics mutates 
Japanese superheroes
Spider-Man characters
Spider-Man in television
Superhero television characters
Television characters introduced in 1978
Transforming heroes